Matsui (written: 松井 or 松居) is a Japanese surname. Notable people with the surname include:

 Airi Matsui (born 1996), Japanese model, actress and former idol
 Akihiko Matsui, Japanese videogame designer
 Bob Matsui (1941–2005), US California Congressman
 Daijiro Matsui, Japanese mixed martial arts fighter
 Daisuke Matsui (born 1981), Japanese footballer
 Doris Matsui (born 1944), US congresswoman from  California, widow of Bob Matsui
 Eri Matsui, Japanese fashion designer
, Japanese artist
 , Japanese former professional baseball player
 Iwane Matsui (1878–1948), Japanese general and war criminal
 Jurina Matsui (born 1997), Japanese singer, SKE48
 , Japanese former professional baseball player
, Japanese badminton player
 Keiko Matsui (born 1961), Japanese smooth jazz musician
 KJ Matsui, Japanese basketball player for Columbia University
, Japanese politician
, Japanese handball player
 , Japanese professional baseball player
 Mitsuru Matsui, Japanese cryptographer
 Naoko Matsui, Japanese voice actor
 Rena Matsui, Japanese singer, SKE48
 Sakiko Matsui Japanese idol and pianist, former AKB48
 Shokei Matsui, Japanese karateka and Director of the International Karate Organization
 Toshihide Matsui (born 1978), Japanese tennis player
 Yasuo Matsui (1877 – 1962), Japanese-American architect
 Yayori Matsui (1934-2002), Japanese journalist and women's rights activist
, Japanese professional baseball player
 , Japanese professional baseball player

Fictional characters:
 Chisato Matsui, character in Battle Royale novel, film and manga
 Watanabe Matsui, character in the Megatokyo manga
Ricky Matsui, character from the web series Dimension 20

Companies and Brands:
 Matsui (brand), a former "own-brand" for electrical appliances used by Dixons Group stores in the UK
 Matsui (construction company), a Japanese construction company founded in 1586

See also
 Mitsui, a Japanese corporation with a similar name

Japanese-language surnames